Michael Laws (born 1957) is a New Zealand politician, broadcaster and writer. Laws was a Member of Parliament for six years, starting in 1990, initially for the National Party. In Parliament he voted against his party on multiple occasions and in 1996 defected to the newly founded New Zealand First party, but resigned Parliament the same year following a scandal in which he selected a company part-owned by his wife for a government contract.

Laws has also been a media personality, working as a Radio Live morning talkback host and a longstanding The Sunday Star-Times columnist.

Laws has held several roles in local government since 1995. He has been elected as a councillor to Napier City Council (1995–1996), Whanganui District Council (2013–2014) and Otago Regional Council (2016 – present), as a member of Whanganui District Health Board, and as Mayor of Whanganui (2004–2010).

Early life 
Laws was born in Wairoa on 26 June 1957. He moved with his parents to Whanganui where he received his pre-tertiary education at Tawhero Primary School, Whanganui Intermediate School, and Whanganui Boys' College. His father, Keith Laws, a schoolteacher, became rector (principal) of Waitaki Boys' High School in Oamaru and then of Scots College, Wellington.

On leaving school, Laws worked at the Whakatu freezing works before entering the University of Otago, graduating with first-class honours in history and won an Otago University sporting blue. He later obtained a Master of Arts from Victoria University. During his time at Otago, he attracted controversy as a key member of a student organisation that supported the 1981 Springbok Tour. He also became a public speaker and captained both the New Zealand Universities and New Zealand debating teams in the early-mid-1980s.

Member of Parliament 

Having become involved in the New Zealand Young Nationals (the youth wing of the National Party), Laws worked as a parliamentary researcher for National between 1985 and 1989. Most of this time he spent as a senior researcher and press secretary, including assisting the dissident National MP Winston Peters from 1987 to 1989. In the 1987 election, Laws stood as the National candidate for the Hawkes Bay seat, but narrowly lost to the incumbent Bill Sutton of the Labour Party. In the 1990 election, however, Laws wrestled the seat from Sutton to enter Parliament with a majority of 2,895 votes. In the 1993 election he retained his seat with an increased majority, despite the National Party generally losing support.

Departure from National Party 
Laws never had a good relationship with the National Party's senior hierarchy. As a researcher, he had done much of his work for Winston Peters, whom party leader Jim Bolger looked upon with disapproval. Tensions persisted between Laws and Bolger after Laws became an MP, made worse by Laws' declaration that he would attempt to follow popular opinion in Hawke's Bay rather than National Party policy. Laws voted against his party on a number of issues, joining several other dissident MPs to oppose the economic policies of the Minister of Finance Ruth Richardson. In early 1991, he even organised public seminars designed to avoid his government's new superannuation surtax policies. The Bolger administration later abandoned the surtax, but Laws earned the ongoing enmity of his colleagues for his stance. He also championed the unsuccessful Death with Dignity Bill, which aimed to legalise voluntary euthanasia. The terminal illness of Cam Campion, a fellow dissident in Laws' first term in parliament, prompted this advocacy.

"Waka-jumping"—where an MP left a party between elections to join another but retain their seat in Parliament—became common during Laws' parliamentary career and rumours frequently circulated that he planned to join a new party. When Gilbert Myles and Hamish MacIntyre left National to found the new Liberal Party, they invited Laws to join them, but he declined. Later, when Peters was expelled from National and eventually formed New Zealand First, it was reported that Laws had considered changing parties but eventually decided that the new party lacked the organisation and principle for success. Finally, Laws became involved in discussions with Mike Moore, former leader (1990–1993) of the Labour Party, to establish a new centrist party. It did not eventuate, however, with Laws claiming that Moore showed unwillingness to commit to it. In the end, Laws' relationship with the National Party deteriorated to the point where he no longer attended caucus meetings, and he decided to join New Zealand First in April 1996.

Resignation from Parliament 
Laws had also been elected (in October 1995) as a Napier city councillor. In that role, Laws awarded a contract to conduct a Napier City Council communications poll to a company part-owned by his wife. This appeared to contravene the Local Government (Members' Interests) Act 1968. Laws claimed "there had been no profit to either company or individuals," and an official inquiry by the Auditor-General confirmed found only a minor and unintentional breach of regulations in not declaring his wife's shareholding.

However, Laws' conduct during the matter attracted strong criticism. Laws had claimed the poll had been carried out by a person named Antoinette Beck, who was supposedly based in Australia. It later became known Beck was not a real person, her signature had been applied by Laws' parliamentary secretary, and that the poll contract had been awarded to Laws' wife's company. After these facts emerged, Laws resigned both from Parliament and the council.

Two of Laws' principal antagonists in the Antoinette Beck affair—Napier city councillors John Harrison and Kerry Single—unsuccessfully sued him for defamation. Laws defended himself in the Napier High Court in December 1997 and the Court awarded costs of over NZ$200,000 against the joint plaintiffs.

1996 general election 
Laws remained involved in politics and managed New Zealand First's campaign for the general election held on 12 October 1996. He would later write in his political autobiography that the experience resembled nursing a stick of unstable dynamite. Later he served as an adviser to New Zealand First MP and Associate Minister of Health Neil Kirton in the National–New Zealand First coalition government until Kirton was removed as a minister in 1997.

Local government career

Mayor of Whanganui 
Laws was a member of the Whanganui District Council from 2004 to 2010 (as mayor) and from 2013 to 2014 (as a councillor).

In the 2004 local elections, Laws formed and led a "Vision Wanganui" team which captured the majority of the Council seats and unseated the incumbent mayor Chas Poynter, who placed third behind Laws and John Martin. Laws' administration was controversial: he dismayed the local arts community by cancelling an extension to the Sarjeant Art Gallery, was the subject of a code of conduct investigation after making derogatory comments about some Whanganui residents, and on a radio show he hosted described the deceased Tongan king Taufa'ahau Tupou IV as "a bloated, brown slug." Despite complaints, the Broadcasting Standards Authority cleared Laws of any breach of broadcasting standards. New Zealand Herald readers judged it the "worst insult of 2006". Later the New Zealand Press Council cleared columns he wrote on peanut-allergy sufferers and on public-school bans.

Despite this controversy, Laws' "Vision Wanganui" grouping subsequently won two council by-elections in February 2006 and Laws acquired the reputation of having rejuvenated the city and raising Whanganui's profile. He also led the campaign for gang patches to be banned in Whanganui. The council held a referendum on that subject in 2007, which was voted in the affirmative, and with local MP Chester Borrows the council sponsored a local bill which eventually became law as the Wanganui District Council (Prohibition of Gang Insignia) Act 2009.

In November 2006, Laws announced he would not contest the mayoralty at the 2007 local elections. He said he wanted to spend more time with his family, especially his young daughters Lucy and Zoe, but did not rule himself out of standing for lesser public offices. However, citing public pressure, Laws changed his mind about retiring from the mayoralty and signed up to contest a second term on the last day for nominations to be submitted. He also stood as part of a "reformist" 'Health First' team for the Whanganui District Health Board. Laws was successful in attaining both positions, although neither "Vision Wanganui" or "Health First" won majorities.

In his second term, Laws campaigned for the spelling of "Wanganui" to remain unchanged after local Māori, Te Runanga o Tupoho, petitioned the New Zealand Geographic Board to correct the spelling to "Whanganui" with an "h". The council held a referendum in 2009 showed 77% support for the retention of the then-popular spelling, which had been used since 1837. However, the authority to rename the district rested with the Crown, not the council, and in December 2009 Minister for Land Information Maurice Williamson announced that both spellings would be acceptable but the Crown would adopt the corrected spelling.

Laws announced in June 2010 his retirement from the mayoralty for family reasons.

In the October 2013 local elections, Laws recontested the mayoralty, a councillor position, and a district health board position. He lost the mayoralty to the incumbent Annette Main but was elected as a councillor and to the health board. He resigned from the council in April 2014 to move to Timaru, after taking a position at Craighead Diocesan School.

Otago Regional Council 
In 2016, Laws moved to Cromwell and contested a position on the Otago Regional Council in the 2016 local elections. He won his seat in a recount by 5 votes and was re-elected in the 2019 local elections. Laws was appointed deputy chair to new chairperson Marian Hobbs in October 2019 but led a successful effort to replace Hobbs with Andrew Noone in July 2020.

In mid August 2021, Otago Regional Council chief executive Sarah Gardner lodged a code of conduct against Laws regarding comments that he had made about Council staff in two articles that were published in the Otago Daily Times. One of these stories concerned the Council giving advice to a company that it had taken enforcement action against for illegally dumping waste in the Clutha River. The Council ordered an independent investigation into Law's comments headed by Wellington lawyer Steph Dyhrberg. According to Laws, the potential consequences of the complaint included losing his deputy chairman role, being excluded from council premises and functions, and being censured by his colleagues; which Laws claimed would adversely affect councillors' freedom of speech and expression.

In response to the complaints process, New Zealand Free Speech Union Chief Executive Jonathan Ayling petitioned Gardner to withdraw her complaint and amend the council's code of conduct to reflect that councillors represent ratepayers rather than the council executive. They also offered their support to Laws. In November 2021, Laws was cleared of any wrongdoing. According to fellow Councillor Gary Kelliher, the code of conduct investigation against Laws amounted to NZ$20,000 since the Council outsourced it to external lawyer Dyhrberg.

Laws resigned as deputy chair in April 2022 over disagreements with the council's 2022/23 annual plan and was replaced by Kevin Malcolm.

Media career 
Since leaving Parliament, Laws has worked as a writer, newspaper columnist and talkback radio host.

He joined Radio Pacific in 2003 and changed to Radio Live in 2005. He stayed as a radio host throughout his Whanganui mayoralty, stepping back from his nationwide talkback programme in early 2013. Laws courted controversy in this role, as described above. Additionally, in 2008 he was charged with contempt of court for breaching a suppression order on his radio programme and in October 2010 he called Governor-General Anand Satyanand a "fat Indian." Breakfast presenter Paul Henry had previously made similarly disparaging comments about Satyanand. Laws originally refused to apologise for his comments and only apologised after Henry lost his job over making racist remarks about Indian politician Sheila Dikshit. In 2011, Laws made comments described as "outrageous" about a young man with Asperger syndrome who was arrested for minor theft in the aftermath of the 2011 Christchurch earthquake and was suspended from his radio programme after criticising journalists' conduct in their coverage of the 2011 general election.

On television, Laws has participated in reality television appearances on the second season of Celebrity Treasure Island (2003) and the third season of Dancing with the Stars (2007). He hosted a weekly rugby television programme on Sky from 2004 to 2009.

Laws had a regular column in the Sunday Star-Times and has authored three books: a political memoir, The Demon Profession (1998); a mystery novel, Dancing With Beelzebub (1999); and sports biography Gladiator: the Norm Hewitt Story (2001).

By 2022, Laws had joined The Platform, an online radio station founded by veteran broadcaster Sean Plunket.

Personal life 
Michael Laws has five children. The eldest two are from relationships prior to his political career; the youngest three, with former partner Leonie Brookhammer, were born during Laws' Whanganui mayoralty. Laws and Brookhammer separated in 2009.

References

External links 

  (Broken link)
 Council website (Broken link)
 New Zealand Association of Rationalists and Humanists. The Open Society, Volume 76 No. 3 Spring 2003 (PDF, 272 KB) Page 17 (PDF 19), brief biography

New Zealand broadcasters
New Zealand First MPs
New Zealand National Party MPs
University of Otago alumni
Victoria University of Wellington alumni
People from Whanganui
New Zealand crime fiction writers
1957 births
Living people
Mayors of Wanganui
Members of the New Zealand House of Representatives
New Zealand MPs for North Island electorates
People from Wairoa
People educated at Whanganui City College
Unsuccessful candidates in the 1987 New Zealand general election
Otago regional councillors
Whanganui District Health Board members
Euthanasia activists